The following is the list of programs aired by Knowledge Network.

Current programming

Knowledge Network  

Animals at Work (2008–present)
Borgen
British Columbia: An Untold History
Call the Midwife
Coast
Coast New Zealand
Doc Martin
Emergency Room: Life + Death at VGH
Endeavour
Heartbeat
Hope for Wildlife
Inspector Morse
The Island Diaries
Jack Irish
Janet King
The Leading Edge
The Legacy
Mega Bridges
The Missing
Murdoch Mysteries
Museum Diaries
Partners in Crime
Scott & Bailey
Silent Witness
Storyville
Vera
Waking the Dead
Walking Through History
Waterfront Cities of the World
Whitechapel
Wonders of the Universe

Knowledge Kids

Original/commissioned programming

 16 Hudson (2018-present)
 All-Round Champion (2020–present) (resting)
 Annedroids (2014–April 2017; 2020; 2023–present)
 Blynk and Aazoo (2019–present)
 Cutie Pugs (2019–present) (resting)
 Dino Dana (September 2017–present)
 The Game Catchers (2022–present)
 Genius Genie (April 2018–present)
 Kate and Mim-Mim (September 1, 2014–present)
 Luna Chip & Inkie: Adventure Rangers Go (2022–present)
 Momolu and Friends (2022–present)
 The Mysteries of Alfred Hedgehog (2010–December 2017; 2020–2021; 2023–present)
 Run Jump Play (2022–present)
 Wild Kratts (2011–present)
 Wolf Joe (2021–present)
Zerby Derby (2013–present)

Acquired programming
Live action series
 Canada Crew (September 2017–present) (resting)
Animated series

 Abby Hatcher (2019–present)
 Astroblast! (2014-present)
 Big Words Small Stories (2021–present) (resting)
 The Brilliant World of Tom Gates (2021–present) (resting)
 The Cat in the Hat Knows a Lot About That! (2022-present)
 Clifford the Big Red Dog (2021–present)
 Creative Galaxy (2015–present)
 Dog Loves Books (September 6, 2021–present)
 Dragon (2013–present)
 Elinor Wonders Why (September 6, 2021–present) (resting)
 Floogals (April 3, 2016–present)
 Gigantosaurus (2020–present)
 Gus the Itsy Bitsy Knight (September 6, 2021–present)
 Hero Elementary (2020–present)
If You Give a Mouse a Cookie (2019–present)
 Jasmine & Jambo (2022-present) (resting)
 JoJo & Gran Gran (2022–present)
 Kazoops! (2021–present)
 Let's Go Luna! (2019–present)
 Lilybuds (2019–present)
 Little Bear (January 2, 2023–present)
 Martha Speaks (2008–2014, 2016–present)
 Mironims (2022-present)
 Molang (April–July 2016, 2020–present)
 The New Adventures of Geronimo Stilton (July 2018–present)
 Odo (2021-present)
 The Ollie & Moon Show (2017–present) (resting)
 PAW Patrol (September 7, 2013–present)
 Peg + Cat (2022–present)
 Peep and the Big Wide World (2004–2014, 2017-July 2018, 2019–present)
 Pip and Posy (2022-present)
 Pocoyo (2021-present)
 Puffin Rock (2022-present)
 Ruff-Ruff, Tweet and Dave (2015–present)
 S.M.A.S.H! (2022-present)
 The Stinky & Dirty Show (2019–present)
 Super Monsters (2022–present)
 Trulli Tales (April 2018–present)
 Vegesaurs (January 6, 2023–present)
 Xavier Riddle and the Secret Museum (2020–present)

Interstitial series
Original/commissioned

 ABC with Kenny G (2021–present)
 Cutie Pugs ABC (2020–present)
 Luna, Chip and Inkie (2013–present)
 Space Kids (2020–present)
 Sweet Tweets (2017–present)
 Where's My Alphabet? (2021–present)

Acquired

 Alphabet Stories
 Animanimals (2018–present)
 Are You Ready? (2018–present)
 Bamboo Love (2019–present)
 Bamboo Loves Sports (2020–present)
 Best Sports Ever (September 2017–present)
 Box Yourself Minis (2016–present)
 Frankie and Frank (April 2018–present)
 Ginalina's Music Club (July 2016–present)
 I'm a Creepy Crawly
 I'm A Fish (2018–present)
 I'm a Monster
 I LOVE (2018–present)
 Learn to Draw ABCs
 Learn to Draw Minis
 Lil' Doc (2020–present)
 No-No (2020–present)
 Rookie Robot Explores the World (2021–present)
 Tattle Tails
 That's Cool (2020–present)

Upcoming programming

Knowledge Kids

Original/commissioned programming
 Dream It To Be It (2023)
 Galapagos X (2023)
 Riley Rocket (2023)
 Woolly Woolly (2023)
 Audrey's Shelter (2023)
 Mia & Codie (2023)

Former programming

Knowledge Network

A Matter of Taste
A Touch of Frost (1992–2011)
Beautiful Noise (2008-2010)
Born and Bred (2002–2005)
Cracker (1995–2007)
The Detectives (1992-1997)
Dogs with Jobs
Dotto's Data Café
Do You Really Want to Know?
Fake or Fortune?
First Nations: First Stories
Foyle's War
Haida Gwaii: On the Edge of the World
Hamish Macbeth
Imprint
The Inspector Lynley Mysteries
Land Girls
Last Tango in Halifax (2012-2017)
Midsomer Murders (1997-2012)
Miss Fisher's Murder Mysteries (2012-2015)
Monster Moves
Oil Sands Karaoke
Pacific Profiles
Planet Parent
Rosemary & Thyme
The Royal
Quiet Places
Two Fat Ladies
Gaslight Gourmet
Studio BC
Triumph of the West
Upgrading for Electricians

Knowledge Kids

Original/commissioned programming

Bali (2006–2012)
Book Hungry Bears (2020–2022)
CG Kids
Dino Dan (2010–2019)
Dino Dan: Trek's Adventures (2013–2020)
Finding Stuff Out (2012–2019)
Finding Stuff Out with Zoey (2017–2020)
Heads Up! (2005–2013)
Hi Opie! (2014–2019)
Jack (2011–December 2018, 2020)
KidZone (1989–2001)
The Jungle Room (2009–2012)
Lah-Lah's Adventures (September 1, 2014–2016, 2017-December 2018, 2020)
Marco Polo (2013–2015)
Mr. Moon  (2010–2014)
Nelly and Caesar (2009–2012)
The Ocean Room (2009–2012)
Opie's Home (2017–2019)
Pop It! (2007–2010)
The Prime Radicals (2011–2012)
Pup Academy (2019–2022)
Renegadepress.com (2004–2009)
Rob the Robot (September 2010–2022)
Shutterbugs (September 2016–December 2018)
Super Mighty Makers (2019–2020)
Taste Buds (2008–2011)
Think Big (2008–2009)
Wibbly Pig (2009–2014)

Acquired programming

The Acme School of Stuff (1989–1994)
The Adventures of Dudley the Dragon (1993–2002)
Adventures of the Little Prince (1984–1990)
The Adventures of Paddington Bear (2003–2009)
The Adventures of Parsley (1984–1993)
Alice in Wonderland (1990–1994)
Angelina Ballerina: The Next Steps (2017–April 2018)
Animal FanPedia (2022)
Animal Stories (2011–2014)
Art Attack (1995–2013)
Arthur (2004–14, 2017–July 2018)
Babar (2000–2013)
Backyard Bug Adventures (2002–2003)
Backyard Science (2003–2006)
Bananas in Pyjamas (1997–2002)
Barbapapa (1984–1987)
Barney (1994–1997)
Bear in the Big Blue House (2002–2005)
Belle and Sebastian (Japanese TV series) (1986–1990)
Belle and Sebastian (2018–2022)
Benjamin's Farm (2002–2003)
The Berenstain Bears (2005–2013)
Bertie the Bat (1991–1995)
Big Bear and Squeak (2012–2013)
Big Flush
Bitz and Bob (2019; 2022)
Bill Nye the Science Guy (1995–1998)
Blue's Clues (2000–2010)
Boj (2014–2017, 2020)
Boo! (2003–2006)
Bookmice (1995–1997)
Box Yourself (April–July 2016)
Bright Sparks (1995–1997)
Bruno and the Banana Bunch (2007–2008)
The Bubblies (1984–1987)
Bump (1992–1995)
Butterfly Island (January 1988–September 1994)
Can You Imagine That! (2015–December 2018)
Challenge of the Unknown (1986–1988, 1990)
Christopher Crocodile (1995–1997)
Clifford the Big Red Dog (2007–2014)
Cockleshell Bay (January 1987–1991)
Cooking For Kids with Luis
Corduroy (2000–2012)
Creature Features
Creepy Crawlies (1989–1993)
Curious George (2014–2019)
Danger Mouse (1984–1988)
The Day Henry Met...? (January 2016–December 2017)
Digby Dragon (September 2016–2018, 2020)
Dinosaur Train (2009–2019)
Dive Olly Dive! (2007–2014, 2016)
Doctor Snuggles
Doki (January–December 2016, 2019)
Doggy Day School (2010–2022)
Doozers (2014–2022)
Dora the Explorer (2004–2009)
Dream Street (2000–2003)
East of the Moon (1990–1991, 1993–1994)
Eddy and the Bear (2002–2006)
Ella the Elephant (2013–2020)
Ella, Oscar and Hoo (April 2018–2020)
Elliot Moose (1999–2005)
Elly & Jools (1991–1994)
Eric's World (1992–1996)
Ernest & Celestine: The Collection (2019–2022)
Escape from Jupiter (January 1996–1999)
Ethelbert the Tiger (September 10, 2001–2004)
Eureka (1985–1990)
Eyewitness (1997–1999)
Fables of the Green Forest
Fetch! with Ruff Ruffman (2006–2010)
Fireman Sam (1998–2001)
Five (2012)
Five Times Dizzy (1987–1990)
Franklin (2007–2013)
Free to Fly (1987–1991)
The Friendly Giant (1988–1998)
Fun with Claude (2010–2014)
Funny Animals
Garth and Bev (2011–2012)
George Shrinks (2000–2016)
Get Outta Town (2005–2006)
Get Squiggling (2008–2009)
Ghostwriter (1992–1995)
Giver (September–December 2017, July–December 2018, 2020)
Go, Diego, Go! (2006–2010)
Grandpa in My Pocket (2009–2010)
Grandpa's Garden (2004–2008)
Growing Up Wild (1994–1997)
The Gruffalo
Guess How Much I Love You (2012–2014)
Harriet's Magic Hats (1981–1993)
Hattytown Tales (1987–1990)
Helen's Little School (2018–2019)
The Herbs (1985–1990)
Here We Go (1992)
Hi-5 (2003–2013)
The Hive (2013–April 2018, 2019–2020)
The Hoobs (2002–2004)
Humf (2011–2012)
Inquiring Minds (January 1997–2000)
Inuk (2008–2012)
Igam Ogam (2011–2013)
Iris the Happy Professor (1994–1998)
It's A Big Big World (2006–2009)
Jack's Big Music Show (2006–2008)
Jakers! the Adventures of Piggley Winks (2003–2008)
James the Cat (1988–1990)
Jeremy (1984–1993)
Jelly Jamm (2012–2017, 2018–2020)
Jerry and the Raiders (September 2016–April 2017)
Joe and Jack (2012–2013)
Johnson and Friends (1991–1998)
Join In! (1991–1996)
The Jungle Book (2010–2016)
Kaboodle (1989–1995)
The Kids of Degrassi Street (1986–1989)
Kids Planet Video (1997–1999)
Kid-E-Cats (September 2017–2022)
Kioka (2012–2016)
Kimba the White Lion (1985–1988)
Kit and Kate (April 2017–April 2018, 2019–2022)
Kitty Cats (1993–2003)
Kiva Can Do! (April 2018–2021)
The Koala Brothers (2004–2006)
Kratts' Creatures (1997–2010)
The Large Family (2007–2010)
Lift Off (1993–1997)
Lilly the Witch (2004–2013)
Little Bear (2001–2013)
Little Ghosts (2002–2006)
Little Robots (2004–2009)
The Little Prince (2012–2016)
Little Princess (2007–2011)
Madeline (2002–2006)
Maggie and the Ferocious Beast (2006–2013)
Magic Mountain (1997–1999)
The Magic School Bus Rides Again (2020–2022)
Maisy (2000–2002)
Make Way for Noddy (2002–2006)
Making Stuff (2010–2022)
The Magic School Bus (1997–December 31, 2016)
Manon
Mathica's Mathshop (1995–2001)
Maya the Bee (2013–2016)
Miffy and Friends (2003–2007)
Miffy's Adventures Big and Small (September 2016–April 2017)
Mighty Machines (2004–2012)
Milo (2006)
Minuscule (2006–2016, 2019, 2021)
Miss BG (2005–2013)
Miss Spider's Sunny Patch Friends (2009–2015)
Mister Maker (2014–2022)
Mister Rabbit (July–December 2018)
Mofy (April 2016–April 2017, 2020)
Monkey See Monkey Do
Moominvalley (2021–2022)
Moonjumper (1990–1991)
Mop and Smiff (1991–1994)
Moschops (1987–1990)
Mouse and Mole (1997–1999)
Mustard Pancakes (2007–2009)
My Hometown
My Little Planet (1997–1999)
The Nargun and the Stars (1987–1991)
Newbie and the Disasternauts (2013)
Noddy (1984–1990)
Noodle and Doodle (2012–2013)
Noonbory and the Super Seven (2009–2010)
Numberjacks (2010–2012)
Olliver's Adventures (2014)
Olive the Ostrich (2012–2013)
Once Upon a Time... Life (September 1988–July 1990, March–August 1993)
Orm and Cheep (1987–1990)
OWL/TV (1987–1992)
Pajanimals (2013–2014)
Paddington (1984–2004)
Paper, Scissors, Glue (2001–2002)
Paper Tales (April 2017 – April 2018)
Parlez-moi (1981–1987)
The Paz Show
PB Bear and Friends (1998–2002)
Peppa Pig (2004–2012)
Ping and Friends (2019)
P. King Duckling (2018)
Pingu (1993–2014)
Pinky Dinky Doo (2009–2013, 2017–December 2018, 2020–2022)
Planet Echo (2011)
Polka Dot Door (1982–1997)
Poppets Town (2009–2012)
Poppy Cat (2013–2016)
Popular Mechanics for Kids (1999–2011)
Press Gang (1991–1995)
Puddle Lane (1988–1993)
Puppydog Tales (1989)
The Raggy Dolls (1990–1994)
Rainbow (1985–1993)
Rainbow Fish (2000–2004)
Ralph and the Dinosaurs (2020–2022)
Read All About It! (1981–1994)
Readalong (1981–1988)
Ready Jet Go! (July 2016–September 2017, 2019)
Return to Jupiter (1997)
The Riddlers (1990–1994)
Rockabye Bubble (2000–2001)
Rockschool (1988–1991)
Rolie Polie Olie (2005–2014)
Rub-a-Dub-Dub (April 1994–August 1997)
Sagwa, the Chinese Siamese Cat (2001–2014)
Satellite City (1990–1993)
The Save-Ums! (2011–2013)
Sci-Squad (1999–2001)
The Secret World of Polly Flint (1989–1991)
Serious Amazon (2007–2008)
Serious Andes (2008)
Serious Arctic (2006–2008)
Serious Desert (2006–2008)
Serious Jungle (2007–2008)
Shaun the Sheep (2012–2022)
Sid the Science Kid (2008–2013)
Simon in the Land of Chalk Drawings (1984–1990, 2002–2004, 2007)
Size Small (1986–1991)
Skooled (2006–2008)
Small Potatoes (2011)
Smokescreen (1997–1998)
Space Cases (2000–2001)
Space Knights (1990–1994)
Space Racers (May 2, 2014–2015)
Spellz (2006–2009)
Spilled Milk (1999–2000)
Spider! (1994–1997)
Splash and Bubbles (January 2, 2017–2019)
The Story of Tracy Beaker (2002–2006)
Supergran (1988–1992)
Swap TV (2002–2006)
Tee and Mo (April 2018–2022)
Telefrancais (1989–1994)
Teletubbies (1998–2000)
Teletubbies Everywhere (2002–2003)
This Is Daniel Cook (2004–2010)
Thomas & Friends (1985–1988, 2002–2016)
Tickle on the Tum (1988—1991)
Tidbits for Toddlers (1994–1997)
Timmy Time (September 2016–December 2018)
Timothy Goes to School (September 10, 2001–2012)
The Toy Castle (2001–2004)
Today's Special (1986–1995)
ToddWorld (2005–2007)
Tom Grattan's War (1984–1987)
Tots TV (January 3, 1994–1996)
Tottie: The Story of a Doll's House (1985–1990)
Tree Fu Tom (2012–2013)
Tumble Leaf (2015–2020)
The Tumblies
The Upside Down Show (2006–2015, 2017–July 2018)
The Very Good Adventures of Yam Roll in Happy Kingdom (2006–2007)
The Way Things Work (2003–2004)
We Live Next Door (1985–1988)
Wil Cwac Cwac (January 1991–September 1993)
Willo the Wisp (1984–1989)
Windfalls (1989–1992)
The Wind in the Willows (1986–1996)
The Wombles (1986–1988)
Wonder Pets! (2007–2010)
Woofy (2005–2006)
WordWorld (2007–2014, 2016–September 2017, 2019)
Wumpa's World (2003–2007)
Yoko! Jakamoko! Toto! (2003–2008)
Yoho Ahoy (2000–2004)
Zardip's Search for Healthy Wellness (1989–1993)
Zoobabu (2010–2015)
Zoboomafoo (1999–2012)

Interstitial series
Original/commissioned
Nico Can Dance (2015–2016)

Acquired

Animal Alphabet
Animal Numbers
Artifacts
I'm a Dinosaur
Painting Pictures
Really Bend It Like Beckham
Schnezel Bronson's Alien Adventures
Tumbletown Tales
YOUniverse

References 

Lists of television series by network